Oscheius is a genus of nematode.

O. tipulae is a satellite developmental genetic model organism used to study vulva formation.

In phylogenetic studies, based on the analysis of sequences of three nuclear genes, Oscheius groups with Caenorhabditis species  and the Diploscapter, Protorhabditis and Prodontorhabditis 'Protorhabditis' group, all included in the 'Eurhabditis' group of Rhabditidae genera.

References

External links 

Rhabditidae
Rhabditida genera
Model organisms